N scale is a popular model railway scale. Depending upon the manufacturer (or country), the scale ranges from 1:148 to 1:160. However the scale may vary to simulate wide or narrow gauge rail. The term N gauge refers to the track dimensions, but in the United Kingdom in particular British N gauge refers to a 1:148 scale with 1:160 track gauge modelling. The terms N scale and N gauge are often inaccurately used interchangeably, as scale is defined as ratio or proportion of the model, and gauge only as a distance between rails. The scale 1:148 defines the rail-to-rail gauge equal to 9 mm exactly (at the cost of scale exactness), so when calculating the rail or track use 1:160 and for engines and car wheel base use 1:148.

All rails are spaced 9 mm apart but the height can differ. Many older N-scale models may not run well on Code 55 track as their flanges are often unrealistically large, causing the wheels to bounce along the ties instead of ride along the railhead. Wheelsets with these large flanges are colloquially known as 'pizza cutters' due to a resemblance to the kitchen utensil.

An advantage of N scale is that it allows hobbyists to build layouts that take up less space than HO scale, or put longer track runs into the same amount of space, because the models are smaller (by nearly a half) than they are in HO scale (1:87). While N scale is quite small, it is not the smallest commercially available scale, as  Z scale is smaller yet at 1:220 and T scale is 1:450 or 1:480. N scale is considered generally compatible with 1:144 scale for miniature wargaming.

History 

Although trains and accessories of similar gauge or scale existed as early as 1927, modern commercially produced N-scale models were first launched by the Arnold company of Nuremberg in 1962. Unlike other scales and gauges, which were de facto standards at best, within two years N-scale manufacturers defined the gauge and voltage, as well as the height and type of couplers.  For example, Arnold developed the now ubiquitous "Rapido" coupler to provide a simple and robust releasable coupler design.  Although the original Arnold coupler has been joined by more functional and aesthetically pleasing designs, Arnold allowed use of the Rapido design by other manufacturers, so established a common standard to couple together rolling stock from different sources.

N scale has a large worldwide following. Models are made of very many standard gauge prototypes from every continent. N scale's popularity is second only to that of HO. In Japan, where space in homes is more limited, N scale is the most popular scale, and HO scale is considered large. Not all modellers select N because they have small spaces; some use N scale to build more complex or more visually expansive models.

N scale in Australia has become more popular over the years. Modellers use mainly US, British, and European prototypes because for a long time, the Australian market had no N-scale models of local prototype. The creation of local prototypes is now a flourishing "cottage" industry, making Australia N-scale modelling more popular each year.

N-gauge track and components are also used with larger scales, in particular H0e (or "HOe") and 00-9 scale for modelling narrow gauge railways. N-scale models on Z-scale track are used to model metre gauge (Nn3). A small amount of 2-foot (Nn2) industrial narrow-gauge modelling in N scale using custom track is done, but suppliers of parts are few. Nn18 layouts use T-scale track and mechanisms to represent minimum gauge railways. N-scale trains and structures are often used on HO or larger layouts to create forced perspective, or the illusion that an object is further away than it actually is.

Standards 

Standards useful to both manufacturers and modellers are maintained by MOROP in Europe and the NMRA in North America.  These standards are generally the same for such elements as track gauge, scale ratio, couplings, and electrical power, and differ for clearances and other factors that are specific to the prototype being modelled. The wheel and track standards are, however, slightly incompatible and most vendors follow neither standard in part because of this.

N scale locomotives are powered by DC motors which accept a maximum of 12 V DC. In traditional DC control, the speed of the train is determined by the amount of voltage supplied to the rails. The direction of the train is determined by the polarity of the power to the rails. Since the end of the 20th century, an increasing number of enthusiasts have started using digital train control systems to determine the speed and direction of their trains. This has in part been made possible by surface mount technology and new motors that draw very little current (typically 0.2 amps). The most popular digital control systems used in N scale model railways are NMRA-DCC and Selectrix.

The initial agreed-to standard coupling was known as a 'Rapido' coupler from the manufacturer (Arnold); this coupler had been produced under a license from TT-manufacturer Rokal.  Most companies developed their own variants of this coupler to avoid Arnold patents on the spring system. Graham Farish initially adopted a plastic flexible U rather than a spring, Peco used a compatible weighted coupler system (Elsie), and Fleischmann cunningly sidestepped the problem by using a sprung plate. All were compatible, though.

The Rapido coupler system works well, but is difficult to use for automatic uncoupling and also relatively large. In the US, Canada, and Australia, it has been largely superseded by a more realistic-looking magnetic knuckle coupler, originally made by Micro-Trains and branded Magne-Matic. The MT couplers (as they are known) are more delicate and closer to scale North American appearance than Rapido couplers. Also, they can be opened by a magnet placed under the track. Other manufacturers, such as Atlas, McHenry and Kato, are now making couplers that mate with Micro Trains couplers.

European modellers have the option to convert the couplings on their rolling stock to the Fleischmann Profi-Coupler system for more reliable operation should they wish to do so, but most N scale rolling stock continues to be manufactured with Rapido couplers - a design which is fairly robust and easy to mold. Modern N scale stock uses a standard NEM socket for couplers which allows different coupling designs to be used by simply pulling out the old coupler and fitting a new one of a different design. In the UK, vendors are increasingly shipping both NEM sockets for couplers and buckeye (knuckle) couplers. It is also very easy to use for coupling and uncoupling.

Variants 

In the United States and Europe, models of standard gauge [] trains are built to 1:160 scale and made so that they run on N gauge track, but in some other countries changes are made. Finescale modellers also use variants of normal N scale.

United Kingdom  
In the United Kingdom, a scale of 1:148 is used for commercially produced models. In the U.S. and Europe, a scale of 1:160 is used for models of trains, irrespective of the gauge of the real trains from which they are scaled. All of these scales run on the same  track gauge (N gauge). This means the track is a little too narrow for 1:148/1:150 but the difference is usually considered too small to matter. Strict 2 mm fine scale modellers use slightly wider and usually hand-built track.

In Britain, some N scale models are built to "2 mm scale" for "2 mm to the foot" which calculates to a 1:152 proportion.  Early N scale was also known as "OOO" or "Treble-O" in reference to O and OO and was also 1:152, though for an entirely different reason.

2 mm to the foot scale 
A number of modellers in the United Kingdom use 2 mm scale, a closer-to-scale standard than N scale. 2 mm scale is scaled at 2 mm to the foot (1:152) with a  track gauge.  Nearer to scale appearance is achieved by finer rail, flange, and crossing dimensions than commercial N gauge components.
A variation of the 2 mm standards is used by the FiNe group for 1:160 scale. FiNe is dominated by European modellers.

OOO models 
In 1961, Lone Star introduced some of the very first (1:160) N scale models branded as Treble-0-Lectric (OOO) into the United Kingdom. Coupling was by a simple loop and pin arrangement. The novelty of the "Lone Star Locos" line was such that they even found their way to the United States and were sold in the toys area of major department stores like J.J. Newberry.

Electrified models followed soon after. The track gauge was widened to a nominal  and rails were isolated with nonconductive ties (sleepers) for DC operation. Gearing between the motor and the axles at such a small scale was done by rubber bands, rather than the usual worm gear. A different coupling based on a shrunken OO scale coupling was fitted.  The OOO couplings and specifications have long since been replaced by commercial N scale manufacturers.

Australian N scale 
Australian railways use several gauges across the states, although in most cases 9 mm gauge track is used. Some modellers have used Z gauge track for Nn3 models of Queensland Railways. N scale modelling in Australia has been a cottage-industry affair, with typically small runs of resin-based models being produced. Some etch-brass kits have also been released. In most cases, the kits have been bodies designed to run on mechanisms or bogies available from overseas. Some very fine models are starting to emerge from various Australian manufacturers with many kits now available.

Manufacturers have started to engage Chinese manufacturers to produce very high quality wagons and locomotives. The Victorian producer Aust-N-Rail pioneered this approach, while in 2011, BadgerBits released Australia's first ready-to-run N gauge locomotive, a 48 class retailing for around A$240. A new manufacturer has arrived on the scene (November 2011) with Australia-N Railways using both Australian locally manufactured detail accessories and top end Chinese factories to produce their new locomotives and rolling stock. Other kits continue to be released using the more usual method of resin-based castings and it is now possible obtain models of railways running in most states, although the coverage is highly variable.

Japanese N scale 

But, in the case of Shinkansen, which adopted a  track gauge, models are scaled down to 1:160. A small number of modelers adopted a model scale of 1:120 using 9 mm gauge tracks to represent the narrow gauge railway  gauge lines common in Japan. This is a different prototype gauge and scale to standard N scale with the narrower prototype gauge and called TT-gauge.

Notable layouts 

In Germany, Wolfgang Frey started to build an N-scale layout of the  Stuttgart main railway station in 1978. Frey's "Stuttgart Hbf" layout is an exact replica of the Stuttgart main railway station with its related railyards in the 1970s. The layout is based on extensive background research of the prototype. The layout is computer controlled by 27 PCs running software developed by the owner of the layout and features very detailed and prototypical signalling systems. The layout was kept private until his untimely death in October 2012, but in 2017 should be opened as a public exhibition.
 One of the largest N-scale layouts in the world is located at the San Diego Model Railroad Museum in California, United States. Pacific Desert Lines is a  layout featuring hand-laid code 40 rail. About  (scale miles, actually ) of mainline track are on this massive layout, as well as over 500 hand-made turnouts. Many models of San Diego structures can be identified on the layout, including an intricate scale model of San Diego's Santa Fe Depot, the Western Metal Supply Building, the Carrizo Gorge's Goat Canyon Trestle, Palomar Observatory, the American Agar building, and the Carlsbad flower fields and power plant. The model of the Santa Fe depot was constructed using the actual building's blueprints and was featured on the cover of Model Railroader magazine. The Spanish Revival architecture is reproduced using epoxy castings of scale model adobe roof tiles. The Western Metal Supply Building (now part of the left field foul line in the San Diego Padres' Petco Park) was constructed using historic photographs and contains brick castings, brass-etched fire escapes, and computer-generated window panes. The detail on the Goat Canyon Trestle includes the prototype's railings, catwalks, and fire suppression system. The power plant contains fibre-optic strobe lights in its chimney. Many buildings have detailed interiors, right down to the napkin dispenser and placemats on the tables at the corner café. Some surfers appear in the water off the coast. The layout can be operated by manual or computer control. Trains can run completely unattended or a single operator can control the layout with the click of a mouse.
In the United States, a landmark N scale project layout, the Clinchfield, was built in 1978 by Gordon Odegard and featured in a series of articles for Model Railroader magazine.   The article series was also reprinted in the book Modelling the Clinchfield in N Scale by Kalmbach Publishing.  The Clinchfield layout measured  and was noteworthy for a number of reasons: 1) it was highly portable because of its modular construction, 2) it showed the potential of high scenery to track ratios possible in 1:160, 3) it used a unique aluminum frame and (at the time revolutionary) styrofoam construction to cut down on weight and 4) it was highly prototypical for the era.  The Clinchfield layout is one of the most famous American N-scale layouts ever constructed and was awarded as the grand prize in a 1984 sweepstakes.  The layout was also displayed at a number of train shows and has traded ownership several times by private collectors. The prototype Clinchfield Railroad was an operating and holding company for the Carolina, Clinchfield and Ohio Railway. The layout has been refurbished, outfitted for DCC, and was shown at the 2008 N Scale Collectors National Convention in Louisville, Kentucky.
Also in the United States, a massive N scale semipublic layout, named East Valley Lines, is in Los Angeles, California. It is maintained by a semipublic special club and is part of Griffith Park.

See also 
Rail transport modelling scales
NTrak
oNeTrak
Model railway scales

Notes

References

External links 

 Free-MoN
 N Scale Database

Miniature wargames
Model railroad scales
Scale model scales